The Cat That Hated People is a 1948 American animated short film directed by Tex Avery and produced by Fred Quimby, featuring Blackie the Cat. Blackie's voice was supplied by Patrick McGeehan in the style of Jimmy Durante; incidental music was directed by Scott Bradley. The film borrows elements from the Warner Bros.-produced Looney Tunes cartoons Porky in Wackyland and Tin Pan Alley Cats, both directed by Bob Clampett.

Plot

Blackie the Cat complains about his hatred towards people and how they make his life difficult in the city. Because of interference, he is unable to find easy food (a broom to the head stops his drinking freshly delivered milk) or deliver a proper serenade (which is ended by a thrown boot). He also doesn't get along with children (who tie paper bags onto his feet), babies (one grabs him by the tail and flails him around a playpen), housewives (one hits him with a broomstick when he scratches their furniture), or dogs (one uses him as a punching bag, then plays dead after giving Blackie a ketchup-covered axe as the owner arrives). He complains about not being let out of the house (to drink from a water cooler), or allowed to elope with female cats (he is about to kiss one, but instead a human fires a shotgun through his mouth and out his tail).

Blackie continues to complain about people as he walks along a busy sidewalk, with people stepping on him. One person kicks him down the street as he declares that he wants to go to the moon, before he notices that he is at the front of the "Moonbeam Rocket Company" (a sign in the window says "Any place in space - 5 minutes"). He notices rockets to Mars, Venus, a miniature rocket to Palm Springs, and a "Moon Special," which he enters.

Blackie pushes the ignition (below it on the wall is a sign reading "P.S. Hold on to your hats"), and takes off immediately. Buildings and stars duck out of the way and signs reading "NO VACANCY" appear on planets as he passes them. The rocket skywrites "Eat at Joe's" and punches a hole in the Big Dipper before the Little Dipper moves to catch the leakage. The rocket then bounces pinball-style from star to star (with points being displayed for each "bounce") until it registers "TILT" upon lunar impact.

After the crash, Blackie revels in his newfound solitude, but the silence is quickly cut short as he meets his noisy new neighbors, in order:

A bicycle horn tooting itself
A steam whistle blowing
A disembodied mouth and hands repeatedly saying "Mammy, Mammy, Mammy" in the style of Al Jolson
A self-playing accordion
A yo-yo going up and down with the sound of a slide whistle
A manual fire engine siren operating itself
A tire repeatedly having blowouts by running over nails
A claw hammer chasing a nail (the hammer pounds Blackie into the ground before pulling him out)
A tube of lipstick chasing a pair of giggling lips (the tube applies the lipstick to Blackie's mouth; then the lips kiss Blackie's mouth)
A hand and scissors chasing a piece of paper (the scissors quickly cut Blackie into a paper doll chain; two hands then stretch them out)
An invisible dog chasing a fire hydrant
A diaper, a safety pin, and a bottle of baby powder (which overtake and diaper Blackie and shove a baby bottle in his mouth; when he has a temper tantrum his head is diapered as well)
A flower running away from a shovel (when the plant passes Blackie, the shovel digs a hole and plants him; after watering, Blackie "sprouts" and quickly blossoms with a rose in one ear and a carnation in the other; a hand pulls him out of the ground and puts him in a vase)
A pencil chased by a pencil sharpener (the sharpener turns Blackie's tail into a pencil point; he writes "Chump!" on a nearby rock and draws an arrow indicating himself)

Realizing that his original home was much better in comparison to his new surroundings on the moon, Blackie pulls down a backdrop of a golf course, places himself on a tee and sends himself back to Earth with one swing of a golf club. He returns to the same sidewalk he left in "the good ol' U.S.A." and expresses his newfound appreciation of his home and people, who continue to walk all over him.

Availability
VHS/LaserDisc - Tex Avery's Screwball Classics
LaserDisc - The Compleat Tex Avery
DVD - Words and Music (USA 1995 Turner dubbed version)
Streaming - Boomerang App (USA 1995 Turner dubbed version)
Streaming - HBO Max
DVD/Blu-ray - Tex Avery Screwball Classics: Volume 2 (remastered)

References

External links

1948 animated films
1948 short films
Metro-Goldwyn-Mayer animated short films
Films directed by Tex Avery
1940s animated short films
1940s American animated films
Films scored by Scott Bradley
Animated films about cats
1948 films
Films with screenplays by Henry Wilson Allen
Films produced by Fred Quimby
Metro-Goldwyn-Mayer cartoon studio short films
1940s English-language films